Senta Wengraf (10 May 1924 – 6 December 2020) was an Austrian film and television actress.

Selected filmography
 Two Times Lotte (1950)
 Voices of Spring (1952)
 The Spendthrift (1953)
 Franz Schubert (1953)
 Don Juan (1955)
 Sissi – The Young Empress (1956)
 Kaiserjäger (1956)
 Sissi – Fateful Years of an Empress (1957)
 Scandal in Bad Ischl (1957)
 When the Bells Sound Clearly (1959)

References

Bibliography
 Fritsche, Maria. Homemade Men in Postwar Austrian Cinema: Nationhood, Genre and Masculinity. Berghahn Books, 2013.

External links

1924 births
2020 deaths
Austrian film actresses
Austrian television actresses
Actresses from Vienna
20th-century Austrian actresses